Verrua Savoia is a comune (municipality) in the Metropolitan City of Turin in the Italian region Piedmont, located about  northeast of Turin. The 18th-century San Giovanni Battista is a parish church in town.

References

External links
 www.comune.verruasavoia.to.it homepage

Cities and towns in Piedmont